Athani (Rural)  is a rural area in the southern state of Karnataka, India. It is located in the Athani taluk of Belagavi district in Karnataka.

Demographics
 India census, Athani (Rural) had a population of 11255 with 5891 males and 5364 females.

See also
 Belgaum
 Districts of Karnataka

References

External links
 http://Belgaum.nic.in/

Villages in Belagavi district